Rajdrohi : Fight Against The System is a 2009 Science fiction Bengali film directed by Tapan Banerjee. This is sixth directorial film after 2007 "Prem". The film is starring Anshuman, Swati, Manali and Rajatava Dutta. This film is slated to release on 25 December 2009 and is the first science fiction film of its kind in Bengali till date. The film deals with invisibility of human being and is similar to H.G. Wells' The Invisible Man.

Synopsis
A laboratory test on Deep makes him invisible, so he searches for his father who invented the antidote and discovers many secrets.

Cast
 Anshuman
 Swati
 Manali Chakravarty Aaina
 Arun Banerjee
 Rajatava Dutta
 Amit Daw

Crew
 Director: Tapan Banerjee
 Producer: Rajkumar Tiwary
 Story: Avik Banerjee
 Presenter: Sadhna Movies
 Music Director: Babul Bose
 Cinematographer: Babul Roy
 Editor: Swapan Guha
 Playback singers: Shaan, Jaaved Ali, Mahalaxmi Iyer, Anwesha, Udit Narayan, Vinod Rathod and Asha Bhonsle

Production
It was fall 2008 when the story was proposed by Avik Banerjee to director Tapan Banerjee about a man who falls in a dilemma after getting invisible. The story however was in a short form which was later worked on to make a film on it. Due to high budget and "not so contemporary" storyline, many producers stepped back from the project. It was the start of 2009 when Rajkumar Tiwari decided to make a film on the story which impressed him as being a science fiction fan.

The film started on 27 April 2009 with almost a new cast. During shooting, everyone on the floor was not able to adjust with the special effects and stumbled on their natural acting. But eventually the cast became habituated.

The film was completed at various location of Kolkata and Vizag.
The Director Tapan Banerjee's 6th.Film Rajdrohi.
1) Jai Ma Hangeswari year 1980
2) Prem Pratidan     Year 2001
3) Idiot             year 2004
4) Nari              Year 2005
5) Prem              Year 2007
6) Rajdrohi          Year 2009

Music
Songs are composed by Babul Bose and music will be released on Saregama. Asha Bhosle has sung in this film after a break of 15 years.

"Pagla Jhoro Hawa" - Asha Bhosle, Vinod Rathod

References

External links
 

2009 films
Bengali-language Indian films
2000s Bengali-language films
Films scored by Babul Bose